Ana Nahum (31 October 1969 – 9 January 2015) was a Uruguayan journalist, writer, and presenter.

Biography
The daughter of writer Benjamín Nahum, Ana Nahum graduated with a licentiate in communications.

She wrote a book about the history and analysis of the role of women in Uruguayan politics called Mujeres y política (Women and Politics), which contains the testimony of three Uruguayan women leaders: Beatriz Argimón, Glenda Rondán, and Mónica Xavier.

She was married and mother of the sons Sebastián and Joaquín. She was recognized as a Woman of the Year by Juan Herrera Productions in 2011 for conduct in television.

She died of cancer on 9 January 2015 at age 45.

Work
 1994–1997, Muy Buenos Días, Canal 4
 1998–2000, Hola Gente, Canal 12
 2001–2003, Tveo a Diario y Tveo Informa, Canal 5
 2004–2007, Con Mucho Gusto, Canal 10
 2004, El Sentido del Sexo, Canal 10
 2008–2009, La Mañana, Canal 5
 2010–2014, Hola Vecinos, Canal 10
 2014, Mujeres y política

Ana Nahum is considered to be unique among Uruguayan television journalists, having spent several years as a figure on morning programs, and having worked for all of the broadcast television channels.

References

1969 births
2015 deaths
21st-century Uruguayan women writers
Deaths from cancer in Uruguay
Uruguayan Jews
Uruguayan radio journalists
Uruguayan women radio journalists
Uruguayan television journalists
Uruguayan television presenters
Writers from Montevideo
Women television journalists
Uruguayan women television presenters
Uruguayan radio presenters
Uruguayan women radio presenters
Burials at Los Fresnos de Carrasco